Water boatman as a type of aquatic insect can mean:
 Corixa punctata, a species known as the lesser water boatman in the United Kingdom
 Corixidae, a family known as water boatmen in the United States and Australia
 Notonecta glauca, a species known as the greater water boatman in the United Kingdom (called the backswimmer in the United States)
 Sigara, especially Sigara arguta, known as water boatmen in New Zealand

See also
 Boatman (disambiguation)
 The Water Boatman, 2016 British horror film, directed by Chris R. Wright

Animal common name disambiguation pages